The 1997 UNLV Rebels football team was an American football team that represented the University of Nevada, Las Vegas in the Western Athletic Conference during the 1997 NCAA Division I-A football season. In their fourth year under head coach Jeff Horton, the team compiled an 3–8 record.

Schedule

References

UNLV
UNLV Rebels football seasons
UNLV Rebels football